Opsariichthys evolans is a species of cyprinid fish. It inhabits southeastern China and Taiwan.

References

Cyprinidae
Cyprinid fish of Asia
Freshwater fish of China
Freshwater fish of Taiwan
Taxa named by David Starr Jordan
Taxa named by Barton Warren Evermann
Fish described in 1902